Go! Comi was the publishing imprint of the American multimedia company, Go! Media Entertainment, LLC, established to "specializ(e) in publishing Japanese comics for the American market, and in creating new manga and manga-oriented properties for both the Japanese and American markets".

History
Go! Comi was launched in 2005 by writer David Wise and his colleague Audry Taylor; the former served as the company's CEO, with the latter as creative director. They published such best-selling series as the Eisner-nominated After School Nightmare, Cantarella, Her Majesty's Dog, Tenshi Ja Nai!! and Crossroad.

The imprint was shut down during the manga bust that followed the recession. The official website stopped being updated in early 2010 and expired in May of that year.

In 2011, the site was relaunched under new owners with instructions to donate to a PayPal account to revive the publisher, but former Go! Comi creative director Audry Taylor confirmed that the new website was a scam not associated with the defunct imprint.

Distributed titles
07-Ghost
A Wise Man Sleeps
After School Nightmare
A.I. Revolution
Black Sun, Silver Moon
Bogle
Bound Beauty
Cantarella
Cross x Break
Crossroad
Crown
Cy-Believers
Her Majesty's Dog
Hikkatsu! Strike a Blow to Vivify
Japan Ai: A Tall Girl's Adventures in Japan
Kamisama Kazoku
Kanna
King of the Lamp
Kurogane Communication
Love Master A
Night of the Beasts
Song of the Hanging Sky
Tenshi Ja Nai!!
The Devil Within
Three in Love
Train+Train
Yggdrasil
Ultimate Venus

References

External links
Official website (Archive)
Go! Comi's online game (Archive)

 
American companies established in 2005
Comic book imprints
Defunct book publishing companies of the United States
Publishing companies established in 2005